Parindjapyx is a genus of diplurans in the family Japygidae.It contains 11 named species.

Species
 Parindjapyx aelleni Pagés, 1977
 Parindjapyx apulus (Silvestri, 1908)
 Parindjapyx chiorandoi Silvestri, 1933
 Parindjapyx crivellarii Silvestri, 1933
 Parindjapyx dessyi Silvestri, 1933
 Parindjapyx furcatus Pagés, 1984
 Parindjapyx guttulatus Pagés, 1984
 Parindjapyx insignis Pagés, 1984
 Parindjapyx vulturnus Pagés, 1984
 Parindjapyx wollastonii (Westwood, 1874)
 Parindjapyx xerophilus Pagés, 1984

References

Diplura